Cruziohyla calcarifer, the splendid leaf frog or splendid treefrog, is a species of tree frog of the subfamily Phyllomedusinae described in 1902 by George Albert Boulenger. It has a distribution from Esmeraldas Province in northwestern Ecuador, through western Colombia and Panama to the most southerly part of Costa Rica. It is a nocturnal, arboreal frog inhabiting primary humid lowland forest.

Genetic studies
Cruziohyla calcarifer is the most divergent species in the genus Cruziohyla. DNA analysis places Cruziohyla sylviae closer genetically to its sister species, Cruziohyla craspedopus, than to the true Cruziohyla calcarifer described by George A. Boulenger in 1902.

References

Cruziohyla
Amphibians of Colombia
Amphibians of Costa Rica
Amphibians of Ecuador
Amphibians of Honduras
Amphibians of Nicaragua
Amphibians of Panama
Amphibians described in 1902